Fomitopsis subfeei is a species of polypore fungus in the family Fomitopsidaceae. Found in southern China, it was reported as new to science in 2014 by mycologists Mei-Ling Han and Bao-Kai Cui. Characteristics of the fungus include perennial, effused-reflexed (partially crust-like and partially pileate) to pileate fruit bodies, a concentrically grooved cap surface, and a pinkish-brown to vinaceous-brown pore surface on the cap underside. Microscopic characters include spindle-shaped cystidioles, and small, oblong-ellipsoid spores measuring 4–5 by 1.9–2.5 μm. The fungus causes a brown rot on gymnosperms.

References

subfeei
Fungi described in 2014
Fungi of China
Taxa named by Bao-Kai Cui